Thor-Eirik Gulbrandsen (15 July 1940 – 25 July 2014) was a Norwegian politician for the Labour Party.

Gulbrandsen was born in Fjære.  He was elected to the Norwegian Parliament from Akershus in 1977, and was re-elected on three occasions. He had previously served in the position of deputy representative during the terms 1969–1973 and 1973–1977. During his second term as a deputy, he filled in for Sonja Aase Ludvigsen meanwhile she was appointed to the Cabinet, and then replaced her permanently when she died in July 1974.

Gulbrandsen was a deputy member of the executive committee of Skedsmo municipality council during the term 1967–1971, and a member of the council from 1999–2003. In 1999, he was expelled from the Labor Party after he supported a rival candidate for Skedsmo mayor.

After he retired from national politics he took on the last name "Gulbrandsen Mykland".

He died on 25 July 2014.

References

External links

1940 births
2014 deaths
Akershus politicians
Members of the Storting
Labour Party (Norway) politicians
People from Grimstad
20th-century Norwegian politicians